International concentration camp committees are organizations composed of former inmates of the various Nazi concentration camps, formed at various times, primarily after the Second World War. Although most survivors have since died and those who are still alive are generally octogenarians, the committees are still active.

Committees' history and purpose 
During the Nazi era, there were active, underground resistance organizations at several of the camps, such as those at Sachsenhausen, Buchenwald and Dachau. After liberation, these groups became the foundation of post-war survivor organizations for their respective camps.

The concentration camp committees are international organizations because their members come from and live in many different countries. The purpose of the committees is to educate the world about what was done under the Third Reich regarding the arrest and deportation of religious, political and social groups considered "undesirable" by the National Socialists. They also serve to care for the survivors of Nazi brutality, and finally, the committees facilitate communication and cooperation among survivors.

The committees' efforts have resulted in the establishment of numerous camp memorials and commemorative events and displays.

Appeal in the new century 
Held under the auspices of the International Auschwitz Committee in Berlin, there was a meeting of the presidents of the international camp committees from January 24–27, 2009.

A document was produced under the auspices of the International Auschwitz Committee that was signed by representatives of ten different Nazi concentration camps in Berlin on January 25, 2010. It refers to the pledge taken by survivors to work for peace and freedom, to remember the past and work to keep fascism from gaining ascendancy and noting the thinning ranks of their own members, it calls on young people to take up the work for future generations.

List of international concentration camp committees 
 International Auschwitz Committee
 World Federation of Bergen-Belsen Associations
 International Buchenwald Committee
 International Dachau Committee
 International Dachau Sub-Camps Committee
 International Flossenbürg Committee
 Comité International de Mauthausen
 International Committee Mittelbau-Dora
 International Neuengamme Committee
 International Ravensbrück Committee
 International Sachsenhausen Committee
 KLB Club

Notable members of camp committees 
 Jean-Aimé Dolidier (1906–1971), a French trade unionist and survivor of Neuengamme. He was president of the Amicale Internationale de Neuengamme and a member of the memorial site commission, that established a monument there in 1953.
 Hermann Langbein (1912–1995), an Austrian resistance fighter against Nazism and a historian. While in confinement, he led groups of resisters at several concentration camps. After 1945, he was the General Secretary of the International Auschwitz Committee and later the secretary of the Comité International des Camps. In the mid-1960s, he and Fritz Bauer played an important role in the Frankfurt Auschwitz Trials.
 Edmond Michelet, 1962 to 1964, President of the European Documentation and Information Centre. Served under De Gaulle and others as Ministre des Anciens combattants (Minister for War Veterans).
 Oskar Müller, Lagerältester in Dachau, later first Minister of Labor in Hesse.
 Harry Naujoks (1901–1983) – Lagerältester and chronicler of Sachsenhausen.
 Marcel Paul, (1900–1982), French trade unionist, member of the French parliament and survivor of Buchenwald. He and Henri Manhès founded a French organization, the Fédération nationale des déportés et internés résistants et patriotes in October 1945.
 Marie-Claude Vaillant-Couturier, Résistance, resistance at (Auschwitz-Birkenau), witness at Nuremberg Trials.

See also 
 Elie Wiesel
 Kurt Julius Goldstein
 Max Mannheimer
 La Fondation pour la Mémoire de la Déportation
 List of Nazi concentration camps

References

External links 
 Buchenwald and Mittelbau-Dora Foundation Official website for Buchenwald Memorial and Mittelbau-Dora Concentration Camp Memorial. Retrieved April 17, 2010
 Association Française Buchenwald Dora et Kommandos Official website for French Association Buchenwald Dora and Kommandos. Retrieved February 11, 2011 
 Fritz Bauer Institute  Official website. Retrieved April 18, 2010
 Council of Survivors at the Fritz Bauer Institute. Retrieved April 18, 2010  
 Wollheim Memorial Official website with commemoration for victims of Buna-Monowitz concentration camp. Retrieved April 18, 2010
 The Friends of the Sachsenhausen Memorial Museum e.V. Official website. Retrieved May 5, 2010

Anti-fascist organizations
Nazi concentration camp survivors
Holocaust commemoration
Jewish refugee aid organizations